Abulfat agha Javanshir also known with his pen name Tuti was an Iranian noble of Azerbaijani ethnicity.

Early life 
He was born in 1766 to Ibrahim Khalil Khan of Karabakh and Rugan Khanum, an Armenian girl from Nakhichevanik village in Shusha. Had an excellent palace education and involved in affairs government since early age. Ibrahim Khalil Khan sent him to the Russian camp upon arrival of Valerian Zubov in 1796. This event was described by Mirza Jamal Javanshir, the vizier of the Karabakh Khanate and historian: 

He was sent as an hostage to Fath Ali Shah upon death of Agha Muhammad alongside his half-sister Aghabeyim agha Javanshir. He was later placed under Abbas Mirza, given the titular title of khan.

Struggle for heirship 
He was called to Karabakh sometime in 1804 by his father when he had a fall out with his elder son and heir Mammad Hasan agha Javanshir. Since he was born of a "temporary wife" but had a royal favor, Mammad Hasan felt threatened and secretly allied with his other 'legitimate' half-brothers Khanlar agha Javanshir and Mehdigulu agha. Meanwhile, Abulfat agha occupied southwestern part of the khanate - Kapan, Güney, Chulundur and Bargushad provinces (modern Syunik Province, Armenia and Qubadlı District, Azerbaijan) and set up his camp on banks of Vorotan river. He marched on Togh, where his Mammad Hasan was supposedly stationed, however didn't expect his half-brothers joining him. Mammad Hasan, who commanded horse cavalry, battled 5,000 men led by Abulfat in Dizak, in December 1804 and captured 1,000 people alongside prominent Iranian commanders.

He invaded Karabakh again in 1806 with 5,000 strong army accompanied by Amanullah Khan Afshar and Hossein Khan Sardar. However he found out that his father was killed and was resisted by Jabrailli tribe, after which retreated to Syunik where he met Armenian and Azerbaijani nobility. However he was later pursued by Jafargulu agha, his nephew in 1806 for which he was promoted directly to colonel by a supreme order. Abulfat left for Iran and made governor of Dizmar - Iranian part of Karabakh after Treaty of Gulistan. His area of influence was limited with Syunik Province. He was considered as heir to Karabakh sometime in 1820 by his half-brother Mehdigulu.

After breakout of new Russo-Persian War he joined Qajar army in hopes of regaining Karabakh with no luck. Treaty of Turkmenchay deprived him of his remaining lands and he had go back to Iran in 1828, resigning from army in 1833. He died in 1839, Tabriz and was buried in Qom. Most of his family were given estates in modern Eastern Azerbaijan in Iran.

Family 
He had at least two known wives - Nisa Khanum, a daughter of Mirza Rabi, the vizier of Heraclius II and Badir Khanum - daughter of his kinsman Ismail Javanshir with numerous issues:

 Muhammad Ali Khan — Major-General of Qajar Army, served under Qahraman Mirza (son of Abbas Mirza)
 Abbasqoli Khan Motamad-Dawleh (d. 1862) — Governor of Kashan (1835-1841), Kerman (1841-1849), Ardabil and Meshkin (1849-1859), Minister of Justice of Iran (1859 - 1862); married to Dilshad Khanum (daughter of Abbas Mirza):
 Ali Akbar Khan — Major of Qajar Army
 Ali Khan (b. Tehran) — Colonel of Qajar Army
 Pasha Khan (b. Ahar) — Brigadier-general of Qajar Army
 Safar Ali Khan (d. 1922)
 Muhammad Khan
 Yeganeh Javanshir 
 Ardashir Javanshir — Colonel of Islamic Republic of Army, commander of border forces of Parsabad
 Yasaman Javanshir
 Susan Javanshir
 Jacqueline Javanshir
 Fasana Javanshir
 Muhammad Ibrahim Khan Motamad al-Mulk — Minister of Justice of Iran (1862)
 Muhammadqoli Khan Husam ad-Dawleh (d. 17 December 1896) — General of Qajar Army, Governor of Khalkhal (1852-1885), Maragheh (1885-1888), Urmia (1888-1892), Khoy (1892-1893)
 Muhammad Taghi Khan (d. 1850) — Governor of Shahrud and Bastam (1848-1850)
 Abdul Hossein Khan — Governor of Khuzistan and Kermanshah (1840-1844)
 Abolfath Khan — Colonel of Qajar Army

References 

Qajar governors
1839 deaths
Karabakh Khanate
Military personnel from Shusha
Azerbaijani nobility
Azerbaijani-language poets
People of the Russo-Persian Wars
1766 births
Azerbaijani people of Armenian descent
Iranian people of Armenian descent
Azerbaijani emigrants to Iran
Burials in Iran